Cowpar Airport  was located near Cowper Lake Indian Reserve 194a, Alberta, Canada.

References

Defunct airports in Alberta